Tiran (also Romanized as Tīrān; also known as Tehrān, Tihrān, and Tirūn) is a city in and the capital of Tiran and Karvan County, Isfahan Province, Iran.  At the 2006 census, its population was 15,673, in 4,431 families.

References

Populated places in Tiran and Karvan County
Cities in Isfahan Province